Molla Mohammad Sa'id Ashraf Mazandarani (1620–1704), commonly known as Ashraf Mazandarani, was one of the last prominent Iranian poets at the court of Mughal India. He was born into a scholarly family in Mazandaran, a northern province of Safavid Iran.

References

Sources 
  
 

Iranian emigrants to the Mughal Empire
People from Mazandaran Province
17th-century Persian-language poets
18th-century Iranian poets
1620s births
1704 deaths
Iranian male poets